The Shwetaung bent-toed gecko (Cyrtodactylus shwetaungorum) is a species of lizard in the family Gekkonidae. The species is endemic to Myanmar.

Etymology
The specific name, shwetaungorum, is in honor of the Shwe Taung Cement Company for their conservation efforts in Myanmar.

Geographic range
C. shwetaungorum is found in central Myanmar, in Mandalay Region.

Reproduction
The mode of reproduction of C. shwetaungorum is unknown.

References

Further reading
Grismer LL, Wood PL Jr, Thura MK, Zin T, Quah ESH, Murdoch ML, Grismer MS, Lin A, Kyaw H, Lwin N (2018). "Twelve new species of Cyrtodactylus Gray (Squamata: Gekkonidae) from isolated limestoone habitats in east-central and southern Myanmar demonstrate high localized diversity and unprecedented microendemism". Zoological Journal of the Linnean Society 182 (4): 862–959. (Cyrtodactylus shwetaungorum, new species, pp. 899–905, Figure 17, Table 11).

Cyrtodactylus
Reptiles described in 2017